Sara Khoshjamal Fekri (born 21 September 1988 in Rudbar) is an Iranian taekwondoka and the first Iranian female taekwondo Olympic qualifier. She competed at the 2008 Summer Olympics, defeating Ghizlane Toudali of Morocco in the round of sixteen before losing to Yang Shu-Chun of Chinese Taipei in the quarter-finals.

Honors
Bronze medal, Asian Taekwondo Qualification Tournament (2007)
Gold medal, International Taekwondo Tournament (South Korea, 2008)
Gold Medal, International Taekwondo Tournament (Manchester England, 2010)
Silver Medal, Islamic countries
Silver Medal, China Open Games
Silver Medal, Korean Open Game
Boronz Medal, Asian Taekwondo Tournament (Lebanon)
Silver Medal, International Taekwondo Tournament (Netherlands)
Gold Medal, International Taekwondo Tournament (Fajr, Iran )

References

External links
 "Sara Khoshjamal", n°22 on Time’s list of "100 Olympic Athletes To Watch"
 
 

1988 births
Living people
Iranian female taekwondo practitioners
Taekwondo practitioners at the 2008 Summer Olympics
Olympic taekwondo practitioners of Iran
Asian Games bronze medalists for Iran
Asian Games medalists in taekwondo
Islamic Azad University, Central Tehran Branch alumni
Taekwondo practitioners at the 2006 Asian Games
Taekwondo practitioners at the 2010 Asian Games
Medalists at the 2010 Asian Games
People from Rudbar
Sportspeople from Gilan province